Yedeyur (variant spellings include: Yediyur; Yadiyur; Yadiyūr) is a town in the Kunigal talluk, Tumkur district of Karnataka state, India. It is an important center of pilgrimage for people of the Lingayat faith.  It serves as both a temple to and tomb of Siddalinga Shivayogi, a great Lingayat saint of the 15th century.

Yedeyur is situated about 19 km from Kunigal taluk and about 20 km before the cross on the Bangalore-Mangalore Highway.

References

Cities and towns in Tumkur district